Teerpu is a 1975 Indian Telugu-language legal drama film, produced and directed by U. Viswaswara Rao. The film stars N. T. Rama Rao and Savitri, with music composed by Chakravarthy. It was released on 1 October 1975.

Plot

Cast 

N. T. Rama Rao
Savitri
Prabhakar Reddy
Dhulipalla
Mukkamala
Prem Kumar
Ranga Rao
Manorajan
Prasad
Bose
Benerjee
Krishna Murthy
Subba Rao
Sujatha Bhagath
Shyamala
Sangeetha

Production 
Teerpu is the feature film debut of Sangeeta.

Soundtrack 
Music composed by Chakravarthy. Lyrics were written by U. Viswaswara Rao.

References

External links 
 

1970s legal drama films
1970s Telugu-language films
Films scored by K. Chakravarthy
Indian legal drama films